Juuso Lahtela (born 11 June 1985) is a Finnish freestyle skier. He competed in the men's moguls event at the 2006 Winter Olympics.

References

External links
 

1985 births
Living people
Finnish male freestyle skiers
Olympic freestyle skiers of Finland
Freestyle skiers at the 2006 Winter Olympics
People from Kemijärvi
Sportspeople from Lapland (Finland)